Gekkeiju may refer to:

Gekkeiju Online, a video game
Gekkeiju, the Japanese translation of Bay laurel